Leptosiphon breviculus is a species of flowering plant in the phlox family known by the common name Mojave linanthus. It is endemic to California, where it is known from the Mojave Desert and dry spots in the adjacent Transverse Ranges.

It is an annual herb producing a thin, hairy stem up to about 25 centimeters tall. The hairy, oppositely arranged leaves are each divided into very narrow needle-like lobes up to a centimeter long. The tip of the stem is occupied by an inflorescence of one or more white, pink, or blue flowers with purple throats, each about a centimeter wide.

The length of the stem is around  10 cm to 25 cm. The characteristics of the leaf are lobes 3mm to 10 mm, linear to lance-linear. Ecology is deserts and dry montane areas. The flowering time of the Leptosiphon breviculus is May—Aug.

References

External links
Calflora Database: Leptosiphon breviculus (Mojave linanthus)
Jepson Manual eFlora (TJM2) treatment of Leptosiphon breviculus
UC CalPhotos gallery: Leptosiphon breviculus

breviculus
Endemic flora of California
Flora of the California desert regions
Natural history of the California chaparral and woodlands
Natural history of the Mojave Desert
Natural history of the Transverse Ranges
~
~
Flora without expected TNC conservation status